Mitsuami Heroine is a 2004 EP by Kayo, a former member of the Japanese band Polysics.

Track listing
 Mitsuami Heroine
 Natsu Nandesu
 Bokutachi no Jikan
 Midori Poppu de
 Saraba Shiberia Tetsudou

References 
Review and Lyrics: Kayo - Mitsuami Heroine

2004 EPs